James Cecil Parke and Ethel Larcombe were the defending champions, but Parke did not participate. Larcombe partnered with Ronald Thomas but they lost in the semifinals to eventual champions Randolph Lycett and Elizabeth Ryan.

Lycett and Ryan defeated Albert Prebble and Dorothea Lambert Chambers in the final, 6–0, 6–0 to win the mixed doubles tennis title at the 1919 Wimbledon Championships.

Draw

Finals

Top half

Section 1

The nationality of Miss Bristowe is unknown.

Section 2

The nationalities of CGM Plumer and Mrs Plumer are unknown.

Bottom half

Section 3

Section 4

The nationality of Mrs Hall Walker is unknown.

References

External links

X=Mixed Doubles
Wimbledon Championship by year – Mixed doubles